Due to historical associations and geographical location with the United States, Cubans participate in American popular sports. While the majority of Latin American nations embrace soccer as the national game and pastime, in Cuba things are different. The country is not known for its soccer programs internationally. Instead, baseball is the most popular team sport along with volleyball, wrestling, basketball, sailing, boxing, and trekking.

History of sport in Cuba
Post Revolutionary Cuba prides itself on its success in sports. Fidel Castro expressed that sports should be “the right of the people, not the right of the wealthy." He compared Pre-Revolutionary and Post-Revolutionary Cuba by explaining how before, only the wealthy could enjoy sports. He also explains that talent in sport comes from hard work, and a strong will. In modern Cuban society, sport and physical education begin when a child is only 45 days old. The mothers are taught to exercise their children's limbs and massage their muscles to keep them healthy. Children are taught at a later age to play games that resemble physical exercise.

In 1961, two years after the Revolution, The National Institute of Sport, Physical Education and Recreation (INDER) was created. This is the governing branch of all sports and recreation in Cuba. It developed all of the current sports and education programs in place today, including the EIDE, the program that finds naturally talented young adults and enrolls them into sports-oriented secondary schools. All first and secondary schools in Cuba teach sports and physical education as a compulsory subject. There are five sports taught in all standard secondary schools: track and field, basketball, baseball, gymnastics, and volleyball. The students who excel at a certain sport usually find themselves competing in the Cuban summer Junior Olympics, where the EIDE sees their talent and recruits them to a specialized school that caters to just their sport.

More than 27 of these specialised schools are located on the Isle of Youth, a 2,200 square km island to the south of Cuba. Each school enrolls about 600 students. The majority of them are semi-boarding schools where the students board a boat to the island every Sunday evening at the beginning of the week and return every Friday evening at the end. The schools are spread out across the island and have citrus groves in between them. All of the students are required to put in 3 hours of work a day picking or canning fruit.

Every school in Cuba participates in the Junior Olympic Program, which was established in 1963. The competition usually commences in July. Many of the standard secondary schools only compete in the sports for which they have teams. The games have a traditional ladder system where first, local schools compete, then the district winners will compete, and finally the regional winners will compete. For team sports, the winning teams will move on, and the best players from all of the losing teams form a new team which moves on with the winners; this way no single great player will be tossed out because of a bad team. As of 1978, the Cuban Junior Olympics involved 20 sports: Chess, Weightlifting, Athletics, Tennis, Football, Table Tennis, Basketball, Gymnastics, Modern Gymnastics, Swimming, Synchronized Swimming, Diving, Volleyball, Water Polo, Cycling, Fencing, Judo, Roller derby, Roller hockey, Pistol Shooting, Baseball and Wrestling.

INDER has many programs, including the National Institute for Sports Medicine, the National Coaches program, and the National Physical Education Institute. All of these were developed during the relatively strong economic period of 1960–1990. The Special Period of the 1990s–2000s created many special challenges for INDER, including budget cutbacks and a limited amount of electricity, which led to blackouts in the early 1990s. As a result, many of the night sporting events were canceled to preserve electricity.

Cuba's new sports program allows the best players to retire early and take up position on teams in other countries. These other countries hire them due to Cuba's success in training winning athletes. These players earn a large salary, with about 80% of it going directly to the Cuban government. The players then pocket the other 20%, an amount greater than the average earnings of a Cuban resident. It is worthy to note that Castro abolished professional sport in Cuba at the beginning of the revolution, causing all leagues and teams to be considered amateur. However, this outflow of the best athletes and trainers began to take its toll when in 1997 Cuba ended its 10-year, 152-game, winning-streak at the baseball International Cup after losing to Japan 11 to 2. After this, Cuba began to offer material incentives like houses and cars to good players to keep them from playing for other countries. These offerings were not meant to keep completely talented Cubans from leaving the country, but instead to keep the system balanced. By 2007 there were 50 nations around the world employing several hundred Cuban sports trainers and coaches.

Boxing

Aside from traditional cockfighting, other gambling sports, and baseball; boxing was one of the most popular sports in pre-Revolutionary Cuba.

Boxing is still very popular on the island today. In 1992, there were over 16,000 boxers on the island. Across Cuba today there are 494 boxing coaches and 185 facilities. Of the 99,000 athletes in Cuba currently, 19,000 are boxers, including 81 of Olympic competence, with only twelve making the olympic team.

Baseball

Baseball is the most popular sport in Cuba; 62% of the population plays it. Baseball is the official sport of Cuba.

Beach volleyball & Volleyball
Cuba featured a women's national team in beach volleyball that competed at the 2018–2020 NORCECA Beach Volleyball Continental Cup.

The most famous and known player is Melissa Vargas. She is currently playing for Turkey and will take place in Turkish National Volleyball team.

Football

Athletics

There are a wide variety of popular sports in Cuba. For instance, baseball, which became highly popular starting in the 1870s, when Nemesio Guillot started the first baseball club in the country. Chess is an example of an international game that gathered tremendous amounts of popularity in Cuba. This surge in popularity is attributed to chess grandmaster José Raul Capablanca. It became a very important sport in Cuba, to the point where it is apart of the elementary school curriculum.

Basketball

Basketball is one of the top sports in Cuba, yet it is not as popular as baseball and boxing. The Cuban national basketball team won the bronze medal in basketball at the 1972 Summer Olympics after defeating Italy in their last match.

Cricket

Cricket is a relatively small sport in Cuba. Castro believed that young people on the island were becoming too Americanized and wanted Cuba to feel more affinity with the Caribbean. UK Sport, the body responsible for promoting and supporting sport across Britain, answered a request from Cuba's sports chiefs and provided money for a fact-finding mission which it hoped would lead to a four-year plan to develop Cuban cricket.

Wrestling
Cuba had the strongest Greco-Roman wrestling team in the Western hemisphere and one of the strongest teams in the world. They claimed the team championship title numerous times at the Pan American Wrestling Championships, Pan American Games, Central American and Caribbean Games. The Cuban freestyle wrestling team in its achievements is second only to the United States national team in the Americas.

Stadiums in Cuba

References